Map of places in Clackmannanshire compiled from this list

The article is a list of links for any town, village, hamlet, castle, golf course, historic house, hillfort, lighthouse, nature reserve, reservoir, river, and other place of interest in the Clackmannanshire council area of Scotland.

 

A
Alloa, Alloa railway station, Alloa Tower 
Alloa Inch
Alva, Alva railway station

B
Black Devon
Broomhall Castle
Brucefield House

C
Cambus
Castle Campbell
Clackmannan, Clackmannan Tower
Coalsnaughton
Clackmannan House

D
Devonside
Dollar
Dumyat

F
Fishcross
Forestmill, Forest Mill railway station

G
Gean House
Glenochil

H
Harviestoun, Harviestoun Brewery
Helensfield

I
Inglewood

K
Kennet

M
Menstrie, Menstrie Castle, Menstrie Glen
Muckhart
Myreton Hill

O
Ochil Hills

R
Recreation Park
River Devon
River Forth

S
Sauchie, Sauchie Tower
Solsgirth
Strathdevon

T
Tillicoultry
Tullibody, Tullibody Inch, Tullibody Old Kirk

See also
List of places in Scotland

Clackmannanshire
Geography of Clackmannanshire
Lists of places in Scotland
Populated places in Scotland